Shuangfeng County No. 1 High School, commonly abbreviated as (Shuangfeng) Yizhong, is a public coeducational high school in Shuangfeng County, Hunan, China.

History
The school traces its origins to the former Shuangfeng Academy, founded by the local government in 1760 and would later become the Shuangfeng School in 1905.

In 1905, under the order of Qing dynasty (1644–1911) Emperor Guangxu (1871–1908), the old academy was renamed Shuangfeng Higher School. Peng Shiyi was the first supervisor.

In 1941, the school became a middle school.

In March 1950, the school merged with Xiangxiang Second Girls' Vocational School to form the Xiangxiang County Second Meddle School. Peng Xixian served as its president.

In November 1953, the school was renamed Xiangxiang County First Meddle School.

In 1956, the school became a high school.

In 2017, Shuangfeng County No. 1 High School ranked at number 389 on the National Top 500 High Schools. In January, the new campus has been basically completed and fully operational.

Athletics
 Volleyball
 Basketball
 Football
 Table tennis
 Badminton
 Running

Notable alumni
 Cai Hesen, revolutionist.
 Cai Chang, politician.
 Huang Gonglüe, general.
 Song Xilian, politician.

Gallery

References

External links

Educational institutions established in 1905
High schools in Loudi
1905 establishments in China
Shuangfeng County